Ryan James Sellers (born 13 October 1994) is a former English professional footballer. He previously played for Bolton Wanderers, Wycombe Wanderers, Wingate & Finchley, Halifax Town, Wealdstone and Hemel Hempstead Town.

Club career
Sellers started his career with Wingate & Finchley, joining aged 13 before a six-month spell at Barnet before eventually returning back to Wingate & Finchley towards the conclusion of the 2012–13 campaign, in which he subsequently broke into the first-team. He also enjoyed a brief loan spell with London Lions during his second stint back at Wingate. In November 2013, Sellers was one of six youngsters chosen to win a place at the famed Nike Academy, where he spent the remainder of the 2013–14 campaign before earning a move to Football League side, Bolton Wanderers in July 2014.

Sellers joined League Two side Wycombe Wanderers in June 2015. He made his professional debut on 8 August 2015 in a 3–0 victory against York City. On 9 May 2016, it was announced that Sellers would leave the club upon the expiry of his contract on 30 June 2016.

In August 2016, after trials with numerous National League sides including Woking, Sellers re-joined his boyhood club Wingate & Finchley. On 13 August 2016, Sellers made his Wingate & Finchley return in a 3–0 away defeat against Tonbridge Angels, featuring for the full 90 minutes.

On 23 February 2017, Sellers joined National League South side Wealdstone. After an eighteen-month spell with Wealdstone, Sellers agreed to join National League side Halifax Town on a one-year deal in July 2018. In May 2019, Sellers returned to Wealdstone.

Following a spell back at Wealdstone, Sellers subsequently went onto feature for Hemel Hempstead Town, a return to Wingate & Finchley and London Colney.

Career statistics

References

External links

1994 births
Living people
People from Mill Hill
English footballers
Association football defenders
Wingate & Finchley F.C. players
Barnet F.C. players
London Lions F.C. players
Bolton Wanderers F.C. players
Wycombe Wanderers F.C. players
Wealdstone F.C. players
FC Halifax Town players
Bedford Town F.C. players
Hemel Hempstead Town F.C. players
London Colney F.C. players
English Football League players
Isthmian League players